Nineta is a genus of insects belonging to the family Chrysopidae.

The species of this genus are found in Europe and Northern America.

Species:
 Nineta afghanica Hölzel, 1982 
 Nineta alpicola (Kuwayama, 1956)

References

Chrysopidae
Neuroptera genera